The 2020 Carsales TCR Asia Pacific Cup was due to be the first edition of the TCR Asia Pacific Cup held at Albert Park Circuit in Melbourne on 13–15 March 2020. The race was going to be contested with TCR touring cars and run in support of the 2020 Australian Grand Prix. The cup would've run as part of the 2020 TCR Australia Touring Car Series. The event was cancelled due to Coronavirus pandemic.

Teams and drivers
The following teams and drivers were entered into the event:

Practice

Qualifying

Results and standings

Points system

 Two (2) points will be awarded for obtaining Pole Position in qualifying.

Drivers' standings

References

External links 
Official website

TCR Australia
Australia
Motorsport events cancelled due to the COVID-19 pandemic